The solo discography of Steve Winwood, a British rock artist, consists of nine studio albums, two live albums, nine compilation albums, and twenty-nine singles. After performing in the bands the Spencer Davis Group, Traffic, Blind Faith, Ginger Baker's Air Force and Go, he launched a solo career in 1977.

Winwood's self-titled debut album was released on Island Records in June 1977. Although the album peaked at No. 12 in the United Kingdom and in the Top 40 in the United States, its singles failed to gain success in either country. His second album Arc of a Diver was issued in December 1980, and was certified Platinum in the United States and Silver in the United Kingdom. Its first track, "While You See a Chance", became a major hit in the United States, reaching No. 7 on the Billboard Hot 100. His 1982 follow-up album Talking Back to the Night did not produce any hits in the United States. However, its lead single "Still in the Game" reached No. 19 on the Canadian Singles Chart, and the second single, "Valerie", charted at No. 13 on the Mainstream Rock Tracks chart.

Back in the High Life (1986) was aimed more towards pop music, selling three million copies in the United States. The single "Higher Love" (taken from the album) became Winwood's first number one hit on the Billboard Hot 100 and Canadian Singles Chart, while also peaking at No. 13 on the UK Singles Chart. "Freedom Overspill", "Back in the High Life Again" and "The Finer Things" became major hits in the United States between 1986 and 1987. His fifth album Roll with It was released on Virgin Records in 1988, with the title track released as the lead single. That song became Winwood's second number one single on the Canadian Singles Chart and the Billboard Hot 100. However, it only became a minor hit in the United Kingdom, reaching No. 53. "Don't You Know What the Night Can Do?" and "Holding On" both became major hits on the Hot 100 and Hot Adult Contemporary Tracks chart in 1988. Refugees of the Heart (1990) contained more soul-inspired elements, debuting at No. 26 on the UK Albums Chart and No. 27 on the Billboard 200. Although its first single "One and Only Man" was only a minor UK hit, it reached No. 5 in Canada and No. 18 in the United States.

Winwood released his next album, Junction Seven, in 1997, which gained mixed reviews and had less success. It was followed by 2003's About Time and 2008's Nine Lives. According to the Recording Industry Association of America, he has sold over 7 million records in the United States alone.

Albums

Studio albums

Live albums

Compilation albums

Video albums

Singles

Promotional singles

Soundtracks
 1982 – They Call It an Accident (Goldeneye Productions). French film about a woman dealing with the loss of her son to a medical mistake.
 1986 – The High Life (ITV Granada). A television documentary about the 1985 Tour de France experience of Scottish bicycle racer Robert Millar (later known as Philippa York).

Other appearances

Notes

References

Discographies of British artists